Succession is an American satirical comedy-drama television series created by Jesse Armstrong, which centres on a super-rich and dysfunctional family who own a global media conglomerate. The show premiered on June 3, 2018, on HBO.

Cast timeline
 Key
  Main cast (receives star billing) 
  Recurring cast (guest appearances in two or more episodes)
  Guest cast (appearing in one episode or credited as co-starring)

Note:

Roy family members

Logan Roy

 played by Brian Cox
Logan Roy is the billionaire founder of media and entertainment conglomerate Waystar RoyCo. He is a brash leader whose primary focus is his company rather than his four children Connor, Kendall, Roman and Siobhan. He is married to Marcia, his third wife.

Logan was born in 1938, to abject poverty in Dundee, Scotland. His mother Helen died when he was four years old, and he along with his siblings Ewan and Rose moved to Quebec to stay with their uncle Noah, who physically abused Logan. Rose died during Logan's childhood under unexplained circumstances, burdening him with lifelong regret. Logan went on to create Waystar RoyCo and grow it into a global media and entertainment empire. His leadership of the company estranged him from his brother Ewan, who despises his politics. He has a son, Connor, with his first wife (who is implied to have been sent to a psychiatric institution), and three children (Kendall, Roman, and Siobhan) with his second wife, Caroline. He eventually divorced Caroline and went on to meet his third wife, Marcia. Logan is shown to have been emotionally withdrawn and abusive to his children to varying degrees throughout their upbringing, leading all of them to continue clamoring for his approval as adults. He is also said to have had a passionate affair with a woman named Sally Ann sometime during his children's youth. As a business leader, Logan is shown to be extraordinarily shrewd, ruthless and well-connected; he holds significant influence over the sitting President of the United States (known within the family as "The Raisin"), who won election in large part due to support from Waystar's right-leaning news network, ATN.

At the beginning of the series, the Roys gather to celebrate Logan's 80th birthday, where it is assumed he will step down as CEO and name Kendall as his successor. However, he shocks his family when he announces he will stay on as CEO and hands them documents naming Marcia as his chief trustee upon his death. Logan suffers a debilitating stroke later that day and is admitted to the hospital, where the rest of his family and inner circle debate how to steward the company while he is incapacitated. Logan soon recovers and announces at a gala event that he will remain CEO, but continues displaying erratic behavior. Kendall plots a vote of no confidence against his father along with Roman and several members of the company's senior management, but it ultimately fails, in part because Logan refuses to leave the room during the vote and instead berates several board members into siding with him, while firing everyone who voted for the motion (including Kendall).

Over the following months, Logan remains at odds with his children: Shiv goes to work as a political consultant for presidential candidate Gil Eavis, a Senator vehemently against Logan and Waystar, while Kendall - a recovering addict - relapses and derails a family therapy session intended to allay public concerns over the company's stability. At Shiv's wedding, Logan learns that Kendall has plotted a hostile takeover of the company alongside his friend Stewy and Logan's nemesis Sandy Furness. After a drug-addled Kendall suffers a car accident that results in the death of a caterer from the wedding, Logan covers up Kendall's involvement and uses the crime as leverage to force him to back down from the takeover. A traumatized Kendall becomes fiercely loyal to Logan, who uses his subservient son to help him combat the takeover bid.

With Stewy and Sandy's takeover bid shoring up shareholder support, Logan's financier and close associates all advise that he sell the company, citing the declining relevance of legacy media in the 21st-century corporate landscape. Logan steadfastly refuses to give up his empire and decides to acquire rival news conglomerate Pierce Global Media (PGM), hoping to make Waystar too large for competitors to buy out. However, the deal falls through after the publication of a major news story exposing Waystar's decades-long cover-up of sexual exploitation on the company's cruise lines. Pierce's CEO Rhea Jarrell remains loyal to Logan after being fired from PGM and helps him navigate the company through the scandal; Logan becomes infatuated with her and eventually names her his successor, alienating Marcia. After a company whistleblower goes public with further details on the scandal, the Roys are called to testify before the Senate. Logan realizes that in order to appease the company's shareholders, he must publicly sacrifice someone close to him as a scapegoat for the scandal. Though the shareholders advise that Logan take responsibility, Logan instead chooses Kendall, who was across the cover-up during his tenure as acting CEO. Kendall obliges, but reverses course during a press conference the next morning by naming his father responsible for the company's historic complicity in the crimes.

Logan and his senior management initially station themselves in Sarajevo (which has no extradition treaty with the U.S.) to plan their defense strategy against Kendall. Logan temporarily steps back as CEO (appointing Gerri as his interim placement), negotiates a settlement with Marcia to ensure her cooperation, and names Shiv Waystar's President of Domestic Operations. Logan experiences a resurgence in health complications upon returning to New York, including heat exhaustion during a meeting with Kendall and shareholder Josh Aaronson, as well as a urinary tract infection that incapacitates him during the company's annual shareholder meeting (forcing his children to make a settlement with Sandy and Stewy without his input). After Waystar and the Department of Justice also reach a settlement, Logan attempts to acquire streaming giant GoJo, but the company's CEO Lukas Matsson instead proposes the opposite, assuring Logan he will continue to control key assets. Logan decides to take up Matsson's offer without consulting his children, whose chances of leading the company are jeopardized with Matsson in control. Kendall, Shiv and Roman attempt to veto their father's decision via their stake in the family holding company. However, Logan and Caroline renegotiate their divorce settlement in time to deprive the children of their voting power, effectively leaving them powerless within the company. Tom is revealed to have tipped off Logan on his children's revolt.

Connor Roy

 played by Alan Ruck
Connor is the eldest son of Logan Roy from his first marriage. Prone to delusions of grandeur, Connor is mostly removed from corporate affairs, residing at a ranch in New Mexico with his young girlfriend Willa and deferring to his siblings on most firm-related matters. In season 2, he announces his bid for President of the United States, running as a libertarian candidate.

Little is known of Connor's childhood, though his mother is implied to have been sent to a psychiatric institution. According to Ruck, Logan divorced his first wife when Connor was approximately eight years old. Though Connor is content to remain distanced from the inner workings of the company, he is often hurt by how frequently he is dismissed or forgotten by his immediate family. Connor holds a deep and obsessive fascination with Napoleonic history throughout the series: his ranch bears its namesake from the Battle of Austerlitz, and he later spends over $500,000 buying Napoleon's preserved penis from an auction, only to later learn it was a fake.

Connor spends much of the first season in New York in the wake of Logan's stroke, while primarily residing at his New Mexico ranch, Austerlitz. His girlfriend, Willa, is a former call girl acting as his sugar baby, though Connor claims to be deeply in love with her and supports her ambitions to become a playwright. After Kendall's failed vote of no confidence against Logan, the family convenes at Austerlitz for a therapy session intended to boost their public image and revive the company's dwindling share price. The session quickly falls apart after their therapist is injured and a relapsed Kendall arrives unannounced at the ranch while intoxicated, instigating a fight with Logan. Connor later has Willa move down to Austerlitz. During Shiv's wedding, he decides to run for President of the United States as a libertarian candidate in the upcoming election.

Connor and Willa soon move to New York, where Willa manages production on her play and Connor sets up a base of operations for his campaign. His family becomes concerned when he announces a platform against taxation, with Logan worrying that it could sabotage his carefully-managed arrangements with the White House. Shiv attempts to convince Connor to call off his run, but Connor refuses and formally announces his candidacy later that day. Connor and Willa attend the funeral of Lester McClintock, the former head of Brightstar Cruises who was known within the company as a serial sexual predator whose misconduct on the cruises was covered up with Logan's approval. The scandal is eventually publicized in a news expose, putting the company in legal and financial jeopardy. Connor himself lands in financial trouble after Willa's play proves to be a critical and commercial flop; he asks Logan for loan of $100 million to cover the play's losses (on top of various other expenses), and Logan agrees so long as Connor suspend his presidential campaign. Connor is devastated, but complies.

After Kendall's surprise public statement naming Logan responsible for overseeing the cruises cover-up, Connor meets with Kendall alongside the other siblings to understand his motives, and is the only one to acknowledge the family's knowledge and complicity in the misconduct. He ultimately decides to remain aligned with Logan, but refuses to co-sign an open letter Shiv drafted attacking Kendall in public. Connor later decides to push his presidential campaign four years out, and seeks to obtain a role at Waystar in the interim to improve his credibility. He briefly sees a chance to reignite his campaign in the present when the sitting president chooses to step down, but fails to convince his family to back him during a conservative donor event in search of a new Republican nominee. During Caroline's wedding in Tuscany, Connor proposes to Willa, who is initially apprehensive but accepts after noticing Connor's dejection over Logan choosing to sell Waystar's ownership to tech giant GoJo.

Kendall Roy

 played by Jeremy Strong
Kendall is the second son of Logan Roy from his second marriage. The presumed successor to Logan, Kendall is struggling to prove his worth to his father amid bungling major deals and battling with substance abuse, as well as toiling to maintain a relationship with his estranged wife Rava, his siblings, and his children.

Kendall studied at the Buckley School, then both Harvard University (where he served as the president of The Harvard Lampoon) and Columbia University, which he attended alongside his best friend Stewy Hosseini. He also spent time in Shanghai learning the fundamentals of the family business. With his wife, Rava, he has an adopted daughter, Sophie, and a son, Iverson, who is on the autism spectrum. Kendall's substance-abuse issues eventually led to the breakdown of his marriage, and he went on to spend months in rehab prior to the start of the series. Throughout the series, Kendall is shown to be well-versed in business principles but intellectually insecure and lacking in authenticity and people-skills. He is an avid lover of hip hop and a strong believer in the technology industry and new media.

Kendall is Logan's presumed heir upon the latter's retirement, but Logan announces during his 80th birthday that he will remain CEO indefinitely. During this time, Kendall narrowly negotiates Waystar's acquisition of media startup Vaulter, whose founder Lawrence Yee holds Kendall and Waystar in contempt. After Logan suffers a stroke and is admitted to the hospital, it is agreed that Kendall become acting CEO with Roman as COO. Kendall consults Stewy's financial aid to prevent having to repay Waystar's $3 billion debt from its expansion into parks, unaware that Stewy is allied with Logan's longtime rival Sandy Furness. Logan eventually recovers from his stroke and announces that he will return as CEO, but continues displaying erratic behavior. Kendall plots a vote of no confidence against his father, but it fails and Logan fires him for his disloyalty. A bitter Kendall relapses on drugs during a family therapy retreat, and spends the following weeks aggressively investing in startups while on a binge. During Tom's bachelor party, Kendall is approached by Stewy and Sandy, who offer to buy out his share of Waystar for half a billion; a vengeful Kendall instead proposes a hostile takeover that will grant them a controlling interest in the company and name him CEO. Kendall serves Logan with the bid during Shiv's wedding. However, he later gets into a car accident while under the influence of drugs, resulting in the death of a caterer from the wedding. Logan promises to make the case go away if Kendall backs out of the takeover; Kendall obliges and breaks down crying in his father's arms.

Over the following months, Kendall, still reeling from the trauma of the accident, becomes staunchly loyal to Logan, who names him his co-COO alongside Roman in order to help fight the takeover bid. Logan forces him to shut down Vaulter, as its poor performance is proving a financial sink for Waystar. Logan decides to buy rival news giant Pierce Global Media (PGM); during a weekend retreat between the Roys and Pierces, Kendall begins a sexual relationship with Naomi Pierce, a fellow addict and influential board member whom he convinces to back the acquisition. However, the deal ultimately fails after Waystar's decades-long cover-up of sexual exploitation on the company's cruise lines becomes public. The Roys are called to testify before the Senate, and Kendall delivers a combative performance that wins them the case but sets the company back against the shareholders, who demand accountability. Despite being privately advised by investors to accept responsibility himself, Logan chooses Kendall to take the fall for the scandal, as he was across the cover-up during his tenure as CEO. Kendall obliges, and asks his father whether he ever saw him fit to run the company, but Logan tells him he is not the "killer" he must be in order to succeed. The following morning, Kendall gives a press conference where he is set to accept the blame for the scandal, but he suddenly deviates from his prepared remarks and names Logan personally responsible for overseeing the cover-up of the crimes.

Kendall takes on a manic, self-aggrandizing zeal following his announcement, frequently ignoring the advice of his lawyers and PR consultants in favor of chasing publicity. He also unsuccessfully attempts to convince his siblings to join him against their father. Kendall's legal battle with Waystar dissipates after his poor performance in a testimony to the Department of Justice, who deem the documents Kendall has recovered on the cruises scandal to be insufficient legal ammunition against Waystar and instead reach a settlement with the company. On his 40th birthday, Kendall receives an offer from Logan to buy out his shares in the company for $2 billion. Kendall gives up on trying to defeat his father and decides to take the buyout to permanently uncouple himself from the family, but Logan ultimately refuses his request and rebuffs him, prompting a despondent Kendall to attempt suicide by drowning while in Tuscany for his mother's wedding. During the wedding, Kendall suffers an emotional breakdown and confesses his role in the fatal car accident at Shiv's wedding to Shiv and Roman, who support him. The three learn Logan is selling Waystar to tech giant GoJo without their input, jeopardizing their control of the company, and decide to form a supermajority to veto Logan's decision. However, Tom tips off Logan on the children's revolt, allowing him to renegotiate his divorce settlement with Caroline prior to the children's arrival and deprive them of their voting power in the holding company. The siblings are effectively left powerless within Waystar.

Roman Roy

 played by Kieran Culkin
Roman is the third and youngest son of Logan Roy from his second marriage. He is desperate for attention and approval from his father, which at times puts him at odds with his siblings, particularly Kendall and Shiv. Throughout the series, Roman is shown to have quick wit and business savvy that is marred by his inability to take himself seriously.

Logan was physically abusive towards Roman during his childhood, and it is implied that he was singled out by his father in this regard (Roman is the only Roy sibling whom Logan has been stated or shown to physically assault, either as a child or as an adult). In the first season, Roman mentions that he had been locked in a cage and forced to eat dog food by his siblings as a young child. While Kendall and Connor both confirm that this did happen, they recall that it was "just messing around" and they had done it because Roman asked them to; it is unclear which version of events is closer to reality. Following this incident, Logan sent Roman to military school for an unspecified period of time. Although he frequently makes crass sexual jokes, he struggles to actually engage in sexual activity with another person. While the reason behind this is unknown, he is shown to be aroused being verbally humiliated and uses this as a means of sexual gratification.

After Logan suffers a stroke during his 80th birthday, Kendall becomes acting CEO of Waystar with Roman as COO. Roman generally ignores his responsibilities during this period, and his girlfriend Grace breaks up with him after he continually disregards her. Though Logan soon recovers from his stroke and announces he will remain CEO, he continues displaying erratic and unstable behavior, leading Kendall to plot a vote of no confidence against his father alongside Roman and several members of the company's senior management. However, the vote ultimately fails, in part due to Roman reneging on voting with Kendall after Logan berates him into siding with him. Logan fires Kendall and keeps Roman on as COO, placing him in charge of a satellite launch out of Japan. Roman pushes for the launch to occur on the day of Shiv's wedding, ignoring safety concerns in the process, and the rocket explodes on the launchpad; Roman is relieved to learn from Gerri that no one was killed.

After Stewy and Sandy go public with their takeover bid, Roman is named co-COO alongside Kendall; he bristles at the arrangement, still upset with Kendall for helping plot the takeover in the first place and unaware of the circumstances that led to his backing out. Out of spite for Kendall, Roman advises that Logan shut down Vaulter, a media startup Kendall acquired whose failing performance is proving a financial sink for Waystar. Roman later embarrasses himself in front of Logan and the rest of the company management when they learn it was he who privately attempted to expedite Logan's planned acquisition of rival news giant Pierce Global Media (PGM). Gerri advises that Roman enroll in Waystar's management training course to learn the fundamentals of the company and earn his father's respect. Roman obliges, and begins a sexual flirtation with Gerri, who indulges his newfound fetish for verbal humiliation. He begins to defer to Gerri as a close and trusted mentor.

After a scandal involving Waystar's cover-up of sex crimes on their cruise lines goes public, Roman befriends Azerbaijani billionaire Eduard Asgarov in an attempt to secure financial aid for Waystar from the sovereign wealth. Roman and Eduard buy the Heart of Midlothian football club as a gift for Logan's 50th anniversary at Waystar, forgetting that he in fact supports the rival Hibs. While the Roys are called to testify before the Senate regarding the cruises scandal, Logan sends Roman along with his CFO Karl and financier Jamie Laird to secure funding from Eduard's family so Waystar can go private. Roman travels to Turkey to make his pitch, but he and his associates are held hostage by anti-corruption militia, who are there to seize key assets on behalf of the Turkish government. Shaken by the experience, Roman returns from Turkey with a heightened clarity, admitting to Logan that the Azeris' investment offer is likely illegitimate.

When Kendall gives a press conference publicly naming Logan responsible for overseeing the cover-up of the cruises incidents, Logan decides to temporarily step back as CEO and install a figurehead in his place. Gerri is eventually named acting CEO, with Roman having lobbied for her to take the title. Roman is pleased with the arrangement, hoping to use Gerri's mentorship to steward his own growth within the company. He and his siblings meet with Kendall, who attempts to convince them to back him against their father, but Roman remains loyal to Logan. Roman lands himself in his father's good graces after convincing him to back fascist Congressman Jeryd Mencken as the new presidential frontrunner, as well as establishing inroads with Lukas Matsson, CEO of tech giant GoJo, with whom Logan is considering a merger. However, Roman falls out of favor with his father when he accidentally sends a photo of his penis to Logan instead of Gerri, who has begun rejecting Roman's sexual advances. Roman later comforts Kendall when the latter tearfully confesses his role in a fatal car accident at Shiv's wedding. The siblings learn that Logan has decided to sell Waystar to GoJo without their input, jeopardizing their chances of taking over the company, and attempt to veto Logan's decision as a supermajority in the holding company. However, Logan learns of their revolt from Tom and renegotiates his divorce settlement with Caroline to void the children's voting rights, effectively leaving them powerless in the company after the merger with GoJo.

Shiv Roy

 played by Sarah Snook
Siobhan, commonly referred to as "Shiv", is the youngest child and only daughter of Logan Roy from his second marriage. She is a left-leaning political fixer who previously distanced herself from her family company until finally receiving an offer of leadership from Logan. She is married to Tom Wambsgans, whom she loves but frequently disregards.

Shiv spends the first season largely distanced from company affairs, working as a campaign consultant for Democratic Senator Joyce Miller. She is shown to be shrewd, competent, and more resistant to her father's wishes than her siblings. Tom proposes to her in the hospital while Logan is recovering from a stroke, and she accepts. Shiv's ex-boyfriend and fellow political fixer Nate Sofrelli reconnects with her and convinces her to join him in working for Senator Gil Eavis, also a presidential candidate with staunch liberal views and a longtime vendetta against Logan and Waystar. Shiv and Nate reignite their affair during the process, unbeknownst to Tom. During her wedding, Shiv admits her affair with Nate to Tom and asks for a non-monogamous marriage; Tom is understanding, though he soon grows to resent the arrangement for solely benefiting Shiv.

After Sandy and Stewy publicize their takeover bid, Shiv and Tom cut off their honeymoon to join the rest of the family in deciding Waystar's future. At the Roys' summer home in The Hamptons, Logan privately offers the CEO position to Shiv; despite initial incredulity, Shiv is elated and happily accepts, even going as far as quitting Gil's campaign. However, Shiv gradually comes to realize that Logan's offer was not genuine, and, in a panic, blurts out the news of her planned succession to both her family and the rival Pierces during a corporate retreat. Her insecurity worsens as Logan grows closer to Pierce Media's CEO Rhea Jarrell, whom Shiv fears is scheming to take over the company, and she works to sabotage Rhea's ascension. During Congressional hearings on the Brightstar Cruises sexual misconduct scandal, Shiv helps track down a victim set to be called as a witness and talks her out of testifying. 

After the hearings, she tries to arrange a sexual encounter with another woman and Tom, which he initially agrees to but backs out of at the last minute. Shiv clearly feels disappointed but accepts this. Tom, resenting their open marriage and Shiv's position above him at Waystar, admits to her during a family vacation that he is unhappy in their marriage and insecure. Shiv, feeling guilty, begs Logan not to use Tom as a scapegoat for the scandal, leading Logan to choose Kendall.

After Kendall delivers a surprise statement naming Logan responsible for overseeing the cover-up of the crimes, Logan decides to temporarily step back as CEO, and asks Shiv to acquire legal representation for the company from her friend and high-profile New York attorney Lisa Arthur. Shiv is irate to discover that Lisa has already been contacted by Kendall, but decides to meet with Kendall herself after learning that Gerri has been named acting CEO instead of her. Kendall attempts to convince Shiv along with the other siblings to join his side, but they all ultimately decide to remain aligned with their father. 

Upon returning to New York, Logan names Shiv President of Domestic Operations at Waystar, which she quickly comes to learn is a figurehead title that is earning her little respect from within the company. However, Shiv manages to successfully negotiate the terms of a settlement with Stewy and Sandi at Waystar's shareholder meeting, thereby preserving the Roys' majority ownership in the company. Shiv and Logan remain at odds after she protests Waystar's backing of controversial far-right Congressman Jeryd Mencken for the presidency. 

Throughout the season Tom has been pushing for Shiv to try to get pregnant by him, but Shiv had said no. Shiv later has a conversation with her mother, Caroline, who tells Shiv she wasn't cut out to be a mother, and asserts that Shiv isn't either. Directly following this Shiv changes her mind and proposes to Tom that they try for a baby. Tom accepts, but during sex asks Shiv to say something bad, and she plays along saying he 'isn't good enough for her but wants her anyway'. Shiv presents this as a game but Tom later admits it hurt him. 

Unexpectedly, Logan decides sells out the company to Gojo. This would leave Shiv, along with her siblings, without guaranteed roles. Shiv organizes a unified front between herself and her brothers and leads them to confront their father together, informing him they will all vote against the sale and prevent it along with voting to remove Logan as CEO. Shiv also takes the time to call Tom and warn him about her father's move and inform him of her plans. She promises Tom an even better place at the company than he currently has but continues to claim the top executive jobs for herself and her brothers. 

Confronting Logan goes well at first, with Roman even able to resist defecting to their father's side. But Logan, angrily, informs them that their attempt to take control from him will not work. He had just finished settling a renegotiation of his and Caroline's divorce settlement, which had previously guaranteed her children votes on the board, to remove this provision. This renders the Roy siblings effectively powerless to stop the sale to Gojo. While exiting the room, Shiv witnesses Logan act uncharacteristically fondly toward Tom, who is suddenly present as well. It is implied Shiv realizes it was Tom who used the information she gave him of their plans and sold them out to her father for his own personal advancement. It can be further speculated that she realizes his betrayal was due to their crumbling relationship dissolving throughout the third season and his prioritization of his career advancement over her.

Tom Wambsgans

 played by Matthew Macfadyen
Tom is Shiv's fiancé and then husband, and a Waystar executive. He is promoted from heading the amusement park and cruise division to running ATN, the company's global news outlet. He is a people-pleaser and enjoys his proximity to the Roy family's power but is frequently dismissed by the family's inner circle, and uses underlings like Greg to wield his power. He is originally from the Twin Cities in Minnesota.

Tom is said to have met Shiv during a turbulent period in her life, and yearns to be a devoted partner to her. However, he privately carries great insecurity over his one-sided relationship with both his wife and extended family, and begins expressing his rage and lust for power primarily through his relationship with Greg - a fellow outsider whom he feels he can bully and manipulate. Upon receiving his new role as head of Waystar's Parks & Cruises division, Tom is given documents by his predecessor Bill Lockheart attesting to a massive internal cover-up of decades-long sexual misconduct on the company's cruise lines. Panicked, Tom confides the information to Greg and plans to go public with it, but Gerri warns him not to; Tom then has Greg shred the documents, though Greg secretly makes copies. During his bachelor party, Tom has an embarrassing sexual encounter with a woman named Tabitha, whom he later discovers is dating Roman. At their wedding, Shiv admits to Tom that she cheated on him with her ex-boyfriend Nate Sofrelli, and asks for an open marriage; Tom forgives her and ejects Nate from the wedding.

After Stewy and Sandy's takeover bid goes public, Shiv gets Tom promoted to the Chair of Global Broadcast News at ATN. Tom is initially elated, given that ATN is Waystar's profit center, and enlists Greg's help in finding ways to improve the network's efficiency in an attempt to upstage its combative leader, Cyd Peach. However, Tom loses his confidence after Shiv reveals Logan offered her the role of CEO, which Tom hoped to inherit; his resentment over his marriage also worsens after he realizes Shiv is using the open arrangement to have affairs behind his back. Unhappy with the culture of ATN, Greg reveals to Tom that he kept copies of the cruises documents and blackmails him to giving him a promotion. Tom is initially impressed with Greg's audacity, but later forces him to give up the copies after the cruises scandal goes public and Tom is pressured by an internal investigation. Tom and Greg burn the copies together, though Greg covertly withholds some of them. During Senate hearings on the cruises scandal, Tom performs disastrously against Senator Eavis' questions and realizes he was set up as the company's scapegoat. During a family vacation, Tom finally admits to Shiv that he resents the way she has treated him; Shiv, feeling guilty, begs Logan not to have Tom take the fall for the crimes to appease the shareholders. Logan ultimately chooses Kendall.

After Kendall delivers a press conference naming Logan responsible for the cruises cover-up (with Greg carrying the recovered documents proving Logan's guilt), Tom joins Logan and his senior management in Sarajevo to mobilize support for the company. He remains cold to Shiv's advances, though he maintains correspondence with her on company matters, which leads to their relationship spiralling further down. Tom's legal counselors tell him he will likely spend time in prison, and decides to volunteer himself to Logan as a scapegoat for incarceration, hoping it will present a tactical advantage. He then privately hires a lawyer outside the company to represent him. Tom gradually becomes consumed with anxiety at the prospect of going to prison, and feels emasculated at having to report to his wife after Logan appoints Shiv as the company's President of Domestic Operations. Kendall attempts to convince Tom to join his side, but Tom refuses despite his likely prison sentence, citing low confidence in Kendall's ability to succeed against his father and decides to break it off. He is ultimately saved from having to go to prison, offering Greg a deal out of relief to which he accepts, and betrays the siblings' attempt to block Logan's sale of the company to him, rendering them without any voting power.

Greg Hirsch

 played by Nicholas Braun
Greg is Logan's great-nephew and grandson of Ewan Roy. Greg is unfamiliar with the rough terrain he must navigate to win over Logan, and finds himself indentured to Tom Wambsgans in his quest for a place at Waystar and with the family. Though he is presented as bumbling and awkward, Greg is shown to possess a keen instinct for survival and a penchant for scheming.

Greg is initially estranged from the rest of the family and working at one of the company's theme parks. However, he is fired on his first day after getting intoxicated and vomiting out of his costume. Greg's mother Marianne admonishes him to attend Logan's 80th birthday and ask him for a job. Greg obliges and meets the rest of the family in the process; Tom immediately begins to prey on him, recognizing him as a fellow outsider susceptible to manipulation. Tom soon learns of a widespread cover-up of sexual abuse on the company's cruise lines, and confides the information to Greg, hoping to publicize it; Greg secretly tells Gerri, who talks Tom out of holding a press conference. Tom then has Greg shred the documents; Greg secretly makes copies. He reveals this to Kendall during Shiv and Tom's wedding; Kendall is impressed.

Greg grows closer to Kendall over the following months, delivering him cocaine and receiving a lavish Manhattan apartment from him as a gift. He begins working at ATN after Tom is promoted to Chair of Global Broadcast News, but is uncomfortable with the network's politics and work culture. He soon reveals to Tom that he kept copies of the cruises documents and blackmails him into giving him a promotion. Tom is impressed and agrees, but later forces Greg to help him destroy the copies after the cruises scandal goes public and the company is subject to an internal investigation. Greg covertly withholds some of the copies while burning the rest with Tom. Ewan, who despises Logan and Waystar, threatens to cut off Greg's $250 million inheritance unless Greg stops working for the company, but Greg chooses to stay. After Senate hearings on the cruises scandal, which link him to the document destruction, Greg decides to ally himself with Kendall, bringing the documents along to Kendall's press conference as proof that Logan personally oversaw the cover-ups and settlements with the victims.

Over that day, Greg becomes paranoid about being targeted by the authorities for his handling of the documents, and seeks out Ewan for legal representation. Ewan hires his own personal attorney Roger Pugh to represent Greg, but Pugh, an anticapitalist, hints that he and Ewan want to use Greg's insider position at Waystar to their own advantage. Greg soon ends his alliance with Kendall after meeting with Logan, who encourages him to use his leverage to negotiate a better position at Waystar in exchange for signing a joint defense agreement with the company's legal team. Greg agrees, hoping to secure an executive position at the parks department. However, his decision to remain loyal to Waystar alienates him from both Kendall - who threatens to give him up to federal authorities - as well as from Ewan, who cuts off Greg's inheritance and instead donates his entire estate to Greenpeace. Greg in turn decides to sue Greenpeace as a ploy to reclaim his inheritance. Midway through, Greg is seen flirting with Comfry, one of Kendall's assistants, who hesitatingly accepts. Later at Caroline's wedding in Tuscany, Greg also attempts to court an Italian contessa who has royal ties to the monarch of Luxemborg. He then accepts Tom's deal that would grant him a higher position in the company, after the latter's fears of going to prison finally resolved.

Marcia Roy

 played by Hiam Abbass (seasons 1–2; recurring season 3)
Marcia is the third wife of Logan Roy. Born and raised in Beirut, she is often at odds with Logan's children, whose trust she has yet to earn. She has a son, Amir, from her first marriage, as well as an unnamed daughter. She is a main cast member in the first two seasons and appears in a recurring capacity in season three.

Logan initially revises his trust agreement to name Marcia his chief benefactor upon his death, panicking his children (none of whom trust Marcia). However, Logan suffers a stroke on his 80th birthday and is rushed to the hospital, leading Kendall and Waystar senior management to disregard the unsigned agreement. Marcia cares for Logan over the course of his recovery, and strives to keep the family united amid their frequent quarrels. However, she is shown to have great contempt for Logan's children, whom she believes to be spoilt and entitled. Marcia and her son Amir become aware of Kendall's involvement in a fatal car crash at Shiv's wedding, and are complicit in Logan's cover-up.

After Stewy and Sandy go public with a takeover bid for Waystar's ownership, Marcia advises that Logan sell the company, finding his age and stubbornness to be detriments to his leadership. She becomes resentful of Logan after he unilaterally decides to pursue the acquisition of rival news giant Pierce Global Media (PGM) and grows closer to its CEO, Rhea Jarrell. Between a family dinner between the Roys and the Pierces, Marcia becomes inebriated and makes several cutting remarks to Logan in front of everyone gathered at the table. She soon realizes that Rhea and Logan are likely having an affair, and walks out in disgust after Logan names Rhea his successor without telling her beforehand.

After Kendall's press conference naming his father responsible for the cover-up of crimes on Waystar's cruises, Logan has Marcia flown into Sarajevo, where he and the senior management have set up a temporary base of operations. Logan's team advises that he and Marcia appear publicly reconciled to help the company's image. Marcia, feeling betrayed by Logan's infidelity, demands a number of assurances from the company to ensure her cooperation, including increases to her financial position and protection for her children. She insinuates to Logan that he can use the car crash as leverage against Kendall, but Logan reminds her that his own involvement in the cover-up makes him equally culpable.

Rava Roy
 played by Natalie Gold (season 1; guest season 3)
Rava is Kendall's estranged wife, with whom he has two children. She appears as a main cast member in season one only, before returning in a guest role in season three.

Rava and Kendall's marriage breaks down as a result of the latter's drug addiction, and she divorces him. The two remain friendly and even have sex again after Logan's stroke, but Rava is insistent on continuing with the divorce; Kendall, who still yearns for her approval, is dismayed. Rava soon learns at Shiv's wedding that Kendall has relapsed on his drug usage, and the two distance themselves from one another, though Kendall still occasionally sees his children.

After his bombshell press conference naming his father responsible for covering up the Brightstar Cruises scandal, Kendall arrives unannounced to Rava's apartment and begins using it as a temporary base of operations. He even invites his new girlfriend Naomi Pierce; she and Rava develop tension after the former has Greg open a wine bottle given to Rava as a gift from her godfather. She then brings her children to attend their grandmother's new wedding at Tuscany.

Other main cast members

Frank Vernon
 played by Peter Friedman
Francis "Frank" Vernon is the chief operating officer of Waystar RoyCo. He is a longtime confidant of Logan Roy, and a member of his old guard, having been with the company for 30 years. He is Kendall's godfather and mentor, who he frequently relies to help win back Logan's favor. He is disliked by Roman, which stems from their days working together at the Los Angeles branch of Waystar.

Alessandro Daniels
 played by Parker Sawyers (pilot only)
Alessandro is an executive of Waystar RoyCo, who is present during the Vaulter acquisition meetings. Sawyers is credited with the main cast in the pilot episode only. The character was dropped from the show when it was picked up for series, with Gerri filling a similar role from the second episode onwards.

Lawrence Yee
 played by Rob Yang (seasons 1–2)
Lawrence is the founder of the media website Vaulter that is acquired by Waystar RoyCo, portrayed by Rob Yang. He holds great contempt for Waystar and Kendall in particular, with whom he is often at odds. Although he is credited in every episode of the first two seasons, he is phased quickly out of the show, with only two appearances in season two, after Vaulter is shut down by Kendall.

Gerri Kellman
 played by J. Smith-Cameron (seasons 2–3; recurring season 1)
Gerri is the general counsel to Waystar RoyCo. She has been with the company for 20 years. She is Shiv's godmother and close confidant of the Roys, in particular Roman, with whom she develops a flirtation and a sexual relationship. She first appears in "Shit Show at the Fuck Factory" and continues in a recurring role through the first season, before being promoted to the main cast from season two. In the third season, Logan temporarily steps back as CEO after Kendall publicly exposes his role in covering up the Brightstar Cruises sexual misconduct scandal. Gerri is named acting CEO in his place. She eventually rejects Roman's advances.

Willa Ferreyra
 played by Justine Lupe (season 3; recurring season 1–2)
Willa is Connor's younger girlfriend. She is a call girl and aspiring playwright, who eventually leaves sex work to pursue a career in theatre. She first appears in "Shit Show at the Fuck Factory" and continues in a recurring role through the first two seasons, before being promoted to main cast from season three.

Karolina Novotney
 played by Dagmara Domińczyk (seasons 2–3; recurring season 1)
Karolina is the head of public relations at Waystar RoyCo. She first appears in "Shit Show at the Fuck Factory" and continues in a recurring role through the first season, before being promoted to main cast from season two.

Karl Muller
 played by David Rasche (season 3; recurring season 1–2)
Karl is Waystar RoyCo's chief financial officer. He first appears in "Shit Show at the Fuck Factory" and continues in a recurring role through the first two seasons, before being promoted to main cast from season three.

Karl has worked at Waystar for 23 years and is one of Logan's most trusted associates; he is implied to frequently solicit prostitutes. He helps Logan defend the company against Stewy and Sandy's takeover bid, though he and most of senior management are opposed to Logan's planned acquisition of Pierce Global Media (PGM). Logan forces Karl along with Tom and Greg to participate in a vicious hazing ritual called "Boar on the Floor" to root out the source of a leak to the Pierces regarding his acquisition plans, though he soon learns that Roman was the one who made the call. Karl accompanies Roman and Jamie Laird, Logan's financial adviser, to Turkey to make a pitch to Azerbaijani billionaire Eduard Asgarov to finance Waystar's privatization. The three are held hostage in a hotel along with other occupants by militia belonging to the president's corrupt son-in-law, who aims to seize key assets, though their pitch is ultimately successful. However, upon returning, Roman admits to Logan that the offer is likely illegitimate, which Karl likewise warns.

Stewy Hosseini
 played by Arian Moayed (season 2; recurring season 1, 3)
Stewy is Kendall's friend from college. He is a private-equity investor with a seat on Waystar's board, and is covertly in partnership with Logan's rival Sandy Furness. He first appears in "Lifeboats" and continues in a recurring role through the first season, before being promoted to main cast in season two. He returns in a guest role in season three.

After Kendall becomes acting CEO of Waystar in the wake of Logan's stroke, he learns that the company is $3 billion in debt due to its expansion into parks, and that the family holding company is entitled to demand full repayment if Waystar's stock falls below 130 points. Kendall goes to Stewy, who agrees to inject Waystar with $4 billion in exchange for a seat on Waystar's board. Kendall soon plots a vote of no confidence against his father and asks Stewy to back him, though Stewy warns that he will side with whoever wins. He ultimately abstains from the vote, causing it to fail (with Kendall being fired by Logan), and continues advising Logan on how to maintain the company's valuation. At Tom's bachelor party, Stewy approaches Kendall, who feels betrayed, and offers to buy out his share in Waystar for half a billion dollars. He reveals his partnership with Sandy, who has a shell company attached to Stewy's private equity fund. Kendall, feeling vengeful against Logan, instead proposes a hostile takeover with him as CEO and Stewy and Sandy with a controlling interest in the company. Stewy and Kendall finalize and deliver the bid at Shiv's wedding in England, knowing Logan will be more vulnerable while out of the United States. However, a drug-addled Kendall gets involved in a fatal car crash that kills a waiter, with Logan covering it up while forcing Kendall to back out of the bid. Kendall refuses to tell Stewy the truth about why he is suddenly reversing course.

Stewy and Sandy continue to persuade key shareholders to join their side of the proxy battle. After the Brightstar Cruises sexual misconduct scandal goes public, Kendall and Logan meet with Stewy in Greece and offer to dismiss all litigation on the proxy battle in exchange for Stewy providing the company with financing to go private, but Stewy flatly refuses. After Kendall publicly names his father responsible for the cruises cover-up, he meets with Stewy and Sandi Furness (Sandy's daughter) to propose a partnership, warning that Logan would sideline them and that together they can avoid a contested shareholder vote. Stewy and Sandi are skeptical, but offer to reach a settlement with the Roys in the event of their winning ownership of the company. Waystar eventually reaches a settlement with Stewy and Sandi during the company's annual shareholder meeting, granting both sides an additional board seat.

Hugo Baker
 played by Fisher Stevens (season 3; recurring season 2)
Hugo is a senior communications executive at Waystar RoyCo. He is in charge of managing a scandal involving Brightstar cruise lines. He first appears in "Argestes" and continues in a recurring role through season two, before being promoted to main cast from season three.

Recurring characters and guest stars
 Marianne Roy Hirsch, played by Mary Birdsong (season 1), Greg's mother. Appears in "Celebration" and "Shit Show at the Fuck Factory".
 Grace, played by Molly Griggs (season 1), Roman's girlfriend. She has a daughter, Isla, from a previous relationship. She and Roman break up midway through the season. Appears in "Celebration", "Sad Sack Wasp Trap" and "I Went to the Market".
 Eva, played by Judy Reyes (season 1), an executive producer at ATN, Waystar's primary news channel. She is presumably fired by Kendall, after she threatens one of her on-air personalities into being his date on an event. Appears in "Shit Show at the Fuck Factory", "Lifeboats" and "Sad Sack WASP Trap".
 Sandy Furness, played by Larry Pine (seasons 1–4), the owner of a rival media conglomerate and a longtime enemy of Logan. He is in partnership with Stewy and backs his private-equity fund, Maesbury Capital. He eventually falls ill (rumored from syphilis) and has his daughter, Sandi, represent him in major negotiations. First appears in "Lifeboats" before continuing in a recurring role.
 Brex, played by Brock Yurich (season 1), Roman's personal trainer. Appears in "Lifeboats" and "I Went to Market".
 Nate Sofrelli, played by Ashley Zukerman (seasons 1–4), a political strategist. He is a former romantic partner of Shiv's who convinces her to work on the Eavis presidential campaign, reigniting their former affair. First appears in "Lifeboats" before continuing in a recurring role.
 Bill Lockhart, played by Mark Blum (seasons 1–2), the retiring head of Waystar RoyCo's Adventure Parks division, responsible for covering up a scandal involving decades of sexual misconduct on the company cruise lines. Appears in "Sad Sack Wasp Trap" and "DC".
 Anna Newman, played by Annika Boras (season 1), an on-air personality at ATN. She is threatened by Eva into going as Kendall's date to the family's annual charity event, the Roy Endowment Creative New York (RECNY) ball. Appears in "Sad Sack WASP Trap".
 Joyce Miller, played by Eisa Davis (season 1), the former Attorney General of New York elected to a seat in the United States Senate. Shiv initially serves as her political strategist, with her husband's nude photo scandal causing tensions between Shiv and her family. Zoë Chao plays one of her staff members. Appears in "Sad Sack Wasp Trap" and "Which Side Are You On?".
 Ewan Roy, played by James Cromwell (seasons 1–4), Logan's estranged older brother and Greg's grandfather. He resides in Canada. He personally despises Logan and his business empire, but stops short of actively working against his brother. First appears in "I Went to Market" before continuing in a recurring role.
 Paul Chambers, played by David Patrick Kelly (season 1), a member of Waystar RoyCo's board. He opposes a vote of no confidence in regards to Logan. Appears in "Which Side Are You On?".
 Gil Eavis, played by Eric Bogosian (season 1–2), a Democratic presidential candidate and United States Senator from Pennsylvania. He is vocally opposed to Waystar RoyCo's attempted takeover of local news networks and becomes a target of their cable news network ATN because of it. Shiv briefly works for him, causing tensions with her family. First appears in "Austerlitz" before continuing in a recurring role through the first two seasons.
 Dr. Alon Parfit, played by Griffin Dunne (season 1), a corporate therapist hired to work with the Roy family as Logan attempts to rehabilitate their public image. Appears in "Austerlitz".
 Angela, played by Lauren Patten (season 1), an art entrepreneur who is approached by Kendall as a client. She rejects him, unwilling to associate with the Roy name. Appears in "Prague".
 Tabitha Hayes, played by Caitlin FitzGerald (seasons 1–2, 4), Roman's girlfriend. She previously had a sexual encounter with Tom at his bachelor party, and was also involved with Naomi Pierce. First appears uncredited in "Prague" before continuing in a recurring role through the first two seasons.
 Lady Caroline Collingwood, played by Harriet Walter (seasons 1–3), the second wife of Logan Roy, and estranged mother to Kendall, Shiv, and Roman as well as a Waystar shareholder. She resides in England, and gets remarried in Tuscany to British CEO Peter Munion, with whom she is suggested to have had a decades-long affair prior. First appears in "Pre-Nuptial" before continuing in a recurring role. 
 Mr & Mrs. Wambsgans, played by Jack Gilpin and Kristin Griffith (season 1), Tom's parents. Tom's mother is a highly respected attorney in the Minneapolis–Saint Paul area. Appear in "Pre-Nuptial" and "Nobody is Ever Missing".
 Jamie Laird, played by Danny Huston (season 2), a banker and financier at Waystar RoyCo's branches. He advises Logan during the proxy battle against Stewy and Sandy, as well as during his attempted acquisition of rival news giant Pierce Global Media (PGM). First appears in "The Summer Palace" before continuing in a recurring role through season two.
 Colin Stiles, played by Scott Nicholson (seasons 2–4, co-starring season 1), Logan's body man. Appears in the background of nearly every episode, initially credited as a co-star before "The Summer Palace".
 Cyd Peach, played by Jeannie Berlin (seasons 2–4), the head of ATN. She butts heads with Tom after his promotion. First appears in "Vaulter" before continuing in a recurring role.
 Michelle Pantsil, played by Jessica Hecht (season 2), a writer researching an unauthorized biography of Logan. Appears in "Hunting" and "Safe Room".
 Chris, played by Saamer Usmani (season 2), an actor in Willa's play who has a one-night stand with Shiv. Appears in "Hunting" and "Dundee".
 Ray, played by Patch Darragh (seasons 2–3), a Waystar executive. First appears in "Hunting" before continuing in a recurring role.
 Rhea Jarrell, played by Holly Hunter (season 2), CEO of PGM. She aligns herself with Logan during the attempted acquisition, and the two later become romantically involved. She is fired by Nan after the deal falls through, and is briefly named as Logan's successor as the CEO of Waystar, putting her into conflict with Shiv. First appears in "Safe Room" before continuing in a recurring role through season two.
 Brian, played by Zach Cherry (season 2), a WayStar management trainee who befriends Roman. Appears in "Safe Room".
 Mark Ravenhead, played by Zack Robidas (seasons 2–3, co-starring season 1), ATN's star anchor and alleged neo-Nazi who causes controversy for the Roys. Initially credited as a co-star before "Safe Room".
 Nan Pierce, played by Cherry Jones (season 2, 4), the de facto head of the Pierce family and majority owner of PGM. A liberal, she is hesitant to sell to the Roys because of their politics. Appears in "Tern Haven" and "Argestes".
 Naomi Pierce, played by Annabelle Dexter-Jones (seasons 2–4), Nan's cousin and member of the Pierce family. She suffers from substance abuse and becomes romantically involved with Kendall. First appears in "Tern Haven" before continuing in a recurring role.
 Mark Pierce, played by Jeremy Shamos (season 2), a member of the Pierce family who is the recipient of two PhDs, and briefly comes at odds with Shiv. Appears in "Tern Haven".
 Maxim Pierce, played by Mark Linn-Baker (season 2-4), a member of the Pierce family who works as a consultant at the Brookings Institution and holds Connor's presidential ambitions in scorn. However, he later joins Connor's campaign as an advisor. Appears in "Tern Haven" and "What It Takes".
 Peter Pierce, played by Max Gordon Moore (season 2), a member of the Pierce family known to be a voracious reader. Appears in "Tern Haven".
 Marnie Pierce, played by Christina Rouner (season 2), a member of the Pierce family who intimidates Tom and Roman at dinner. Appears in "Tern Haven".
 Eduard Asgarov, played by Babak Tafti (season 2), an Azerbaijani billionaire pursued by Roman for his money and ties to the Azerbaijani sovereign wealth. He co-owns the Heart of Midlothian Football Club with Roman. Appears in "Argestes", "Dundee" and "DC".
 Jennifer, played by Sydney Lemmon (season 2), an actress in Willa's play who is briefly involved with Kendall. Appears in "Dundee".
 James Weissel, played by Anthony Arkin (season 2), the whistleblower in the Brightstar Cruises sexual misconduct scandal. Nicknamed "The Weasel" by the Roys. Appears in "DC".
 Kira Mason, played by Sally Murphy (season 2), a victim of sexual harassment and abuse in Waystar's cruises division, where she formerly worked as an entertainment manager. Appears in "DC".
 Senator Ed Roberts, played by Victor Slezak (season 2), a Republican congressman present at the hearing for Waystar's sexual misconduct allegations. Appears in "DC" and "This Is Not for Tears".
 Susan Vardy, played by Debbye Turner Bell (season 2), a journalist who interviews James Weissel regarding the cruises scandal. Appears in "DC".
 Philippe Layton, played by Angus Wright (season 2), a high-profile Waystar shareholder who advises Logan to step down from the company amid the cruise line scandal. Appears in "This Is Not for Tears".
 Lisa Arthur, played by Sanaa Lathan (season 3), a high profile, well-connected New York lawyer who takes on Kendall as a client. She is personal friends with Shiv.  First appears in "Secession", before continuing in a recurring role.
 Michelle-Anne Vanderhoven, played by Linda Emond (season 3), a senior White House aide and longtime friend and confidant of Logan's. She frequently acts as an intermediary between Logan and the President, who is never seen onscreen and simply known as "The Raisin," a derisive nickname used by the Roys. First appears in "Secession", before continuing in a recurring role.
 Jess Jordan, played by Juliana Canfield (season 3-4, co-starring seasons 1–2), Kendall's assistant. Appears in the background of nearly every episode, initially credited as a co-star before "Secession".
 Berry Schneider, played by Jihae (season 3), a leading public relations consultant hired by Kendall. First appears in "Secession", before continuing in a recurring role.
 Comfry Pellits, played by Dasha Nekrasova (season 3), a crisis PR representative working as an assistant to Berry, who forms a connection with Greg. First appears in "Secession", before continuing in a recurring role.
 Keith Zigler, played by Jordan Lage (season 3), Lisa's assistant. Appears in "Secession" before continuing in a recurring role.
 Remi, played by KeiLyn Durrel Jones (season 3), Kendall's body man. First appears in "Mass in Time of War", before continuing in a recurring role. 
 Sandi Furness, played by Hope Davis (season 3-4), Sandy's daughter, who is aligned with Stewy in the proxy battle for Waystar's ownership. She largely negotiates on behalf of her ailing father. Appears in "Mass in Time of War" before continuing in a recurring role.
 Roger Pugh, played by Peter Riegert (season 3), Ewan's anticapitalist personal attorney whom Ewan hires to represent Greg. Appears in "Mass in Time of War" and "Retired Janitors of Idaho".
 Kerry Castellabate, played by Zoë Winters (season 3-4, co-starring season 2), Logan's secretary with whom he has a sexual relationship. Initially credited as a co-star before "The Disruption".
 Sophie Iwobi, played by Ziwe Fumudoh (season 3), a comedian and host of The Disruption, a late-night talk show that skewers Kendall. Appears in "The Disruption".
 Dylan, played by Succession writer Will Tracy (season 3), a writer for The Disruption. Appears in "The Disruption".
 Josh Aaronson, played by Adrien Brody (season 3), a billionaire activist shareholder with four percent equity in Waystar. He organizes a meeting between Kendall and Logan at his private island to determine whether their feud can be reconciled. Appears in "Lion in the Meadow" and "Retired Janitors of Idaho".
 Iverson Roy, played by Quentin Morales (season 3, costarring seasons 1–2), Kendall's son who has autism. Initially credited as a co-star before "Lion in the Meadow".
 Sophie Roy, played by Swayam Bhatia (season 3, costarring seasons 1–2), Kendall's adopted daughter. Initially credited as a co-star before "Lion in the Meadow".
 Jeryd Mencken, played by Justin Kirk (season 3-4), a controversial far-right Congressman whom the Roys support for a presidential nomination. He appears in "What It Takes".
 Dave Boyer, played by Reed Birney (season 3), the incumbent Vice President of the United States, who seeks political support from Logan for his own presidential run. He appears in "What It Takes".
 Ron Petkus, played by Stephen Root (season 3-4), a lecherous conservative political donor who organizes the Future Freedom Summit in Virginia. He appears in "What It Takes".
 Rick Salgado, played by Yul Vazquez (season 3), a Republican Congressman hoping to steer the party back towards traditional conservatism. He appears in "What It Takes".
 Lukas Matsson, played by Alexander Skarsgård (season 3-4), the Swedish founder and CEO of streaming giant GoJo, which Waystar is attempting to acquire. He first appears in "Too Much Birthday".
 Peter Munion, played by Pip Torrens (season 3-4), a CEO with a string of failed marriages and business ventures that Caroline marries in Tuscany. He first appears in "Chiantishire".
 The Grand Duchess of Luxembourg, played by Ella Rumpf (season 3), an Italian contessa who works as an online brand ambassador. She accompanies Roman to Caroline's wedding, where Greg takes romantic interest in her. She first appears in "Chiantishire".

Notable co-stars
 Isla, played by Noelle Hogan (season 1), Grace's daughter from a previous relationship. Appears in "Sad Sack Wasp Trap" and "I Went to the Market".
 Tatsuya, played by Jake Choi (season 1), Lawrence's boyfriend and business associate. Appears in "Shit Show at the Fuck Factory" and "Which Side Are You On?".
 Jeane, played by Peggy J. Scott (season 1), Logan's secretary. She is later replaced by Kerry. First appears in "Sad Sack Wasp Trap".
 Amir, played by Darius Homayoun (season 1), Marcia's son who announces at Thanksgiving dinner that he has been hired to head Waystar RoyCo's animation division in Europe. Appears in "I Went to Market" and "Nobody is Ever Missing".

References

Lists of American drama television series characters
Succession (TV series)